Morlupo is a  (municipality) in the Metropolitan City of Rome in the Italian region of Latium, located about  north of Rome.

Morlupo borders the following municipalities: Capena, Castelnuovo di Porto, Magliano Romano, Rignano Flaminio.

References

External links
 Official website

Cities and towns in Lazio